Matthias Tass (born 23 March 1999) is an Estonian college basketball player for Baxi Manresa of the Liga ACB. Standing at 2.08 m (6 ft 10 in), he plays at the power forward and center positions.

College career
His second season in college was cut short as a result of a torn ACL in right knee in December 2019. Coming into his junior season, Tass was named to the Preseason All-West Coast Conference team. He averaged 10.9 points and 5.3 rebounds per game as a junior. As a senior, Tass was named to the First Team All-WCC.

Professional career
He has played for TTÜ of the Korvpalli Meistriliiga (KML) and the Baltic Basketball League (BBL). Before joining TTÜ in December 2017 he played for Estonian champions Kalev/Cramo.

On August 14, 2022, he has signed with Aquila Basket Trento of the LBA. On August 20, 2022, Tass joined MKS Dąbrowa Górnicza of the Polish Basketball League on loan.

On November 13, 2022, he signed with Baxi Manresa of the Liga ACB.

Career statistics

College

|-
| style="text-align:left;"| 2018–19
| style="text-align:left;"| Saint Mary's
| 34 || 0 || 14.8 || .495 || .250 || .667 || 3.1 || .6 || .5 || .3 || 3.7
|-
| style="text-align:left;"| 2019–20
| style="text-align:left;"| Saint Mary's
| 14 || 13 || 23.4 || .534 || – || .750 || 3.6 || 2.2 || .6 || 1.3 || 6.6
|-
| style="text-align:left;"| 2020–21
| style="text-align:left;"| Saint Mary's
| 24 || 24 || 29.3 || .509 || .222 || .617 || 5.3 || 1.7 || .7 || .8  || 10.9
|-
| style="text-align:left;"| 2021–22
| style="text-align:left;"| Saint Mary's
| 34 || 34 || 28.9 || .559 || .111 || .796 || 6.1 || 2.1 || .5 || .7  || 12.6
|- class="sortbottom"
| style="text-align:center;" colspan="2"| Career
| 106 || 71 || 23.7 || .532 || .182	|| .724	|| 4.7 || 1.5 || .5 || .7 || 8.6

Domestic leagues

Estonian national team

|-
| style="text-align:left;"| 2014
| style="text-align:left;"| 2014 FIBA Europe Under-16 Championship Division B
| style="text-align:left;"| Estonia U-16
| 9 || 0 || 17.1 || .455 || .000 || .250 || 4.3 || .6 || .9 || .8 || 2.3
|-
| style="text-align:left;"| 2015
| style="text-align:left;"| 2015 FIBA Europe Under-16 Championship Division B
| style="text-align:left;"| Estonia U-16
| 8 || 8 || 23.4 || .438 || .000 || .671 || 7.8 || 1.1 || 1.0 || 2.2 || 7.8
|-
| style="text-align:left;"| 2016
| style="text-align:left;"| 2016 FIBA Europe Under-18 Championship Division B
| style="text-align:left;"| Estonia U-18
| 8 || - || 34.0 || .554 || .000 || .577 || 11.0 || 2.9 || 1.0 || 3.1 || 13.4
|-
| style="text-align:left;"| 2017
| style="text-align:left;"| 2017 FIBA U18 European Championship Division B
| style="text-align:left;"| Estonia U-18
| 8 || 8 || 25.2 || .552 || .333 || .591 || 8.4 || 2.5 || 1.3 || 2.6 || 11.4

Awards and accomplishments

Professional career
Kalev/Cramo
 Estonian League champion: 2017
 Estonian Cup winner: 2016

Individual
 Estonian League Best Young Player: 2018

References

External links
Saint Mary's Gaels bio

1999 births
Living people
Bàsquet Manresa players
BC Kalev/Cramo players
Centers (basketball)
Estonian expatriate basketball people in Poland
Estonian expatriate basketball people in the United States
Estonian men's basketball players
Korvpalli Meistriliiga players
MKS Dąbrowa Górnicza (basketball) players
Power forwards (basketball)
Saint Mary's Gaels men's basketball players
Basketball players from Tallinn
TTÜ KK players